The fourth season of Stargate Atlantis, an American-Canadian television series, began airing on September 28, 2007 on the US-American Sci Fi Channel. The fourth season concluded after 20 episodes on March 7, 2008 on Sci Fi. The series was developed by Brad Wright and Robert C. Cooper, who also served as executive producers. Amanda Tapping (Col. Samantha Carter) joins the cast as a regular for 14 episodes, Jewel Staite (Dr. Jennifer Keller) was a recurring character for eleven episodes, while regular cast member Torri Higginson (Dr. Elizabeth Weir) was a recurring cast member for four episodes. Other season four regular cast members include Joe Flanigan, Rachel Luttrell, Jason Momoa and David Hewlett.

Cast
 Starring Joe Flanigan as Lt. Colonel John Sheppard
 Amanda Tapping as Colonel Samantha Carter
 Rachel Luttrell as Teyla Emmagan
 With Jason Momoa as Ronon Dex
 And David Hewlett as Dr. Rodney McKay

Episodes

Episodes in bold are continuous episodes, where the story spans over 2 or more episodes.

Production 
With the season premier, "Adrift", Amanda Tapping replaces Torri Higginson in the opening credits sequence, with Paul McGillion no longer appearing. This marks Amanda Tapping's first appearance as a main character on Atlantis. It also marks the only time an actor has appeared in the opening credits of both Stargate SG-1 and Atlantis. Christopher Judge has a cameo appearance as his Stargate SG-1 character Teal'c in "Reunion" and guest stars in the episode "Midway". Judge is the last original Stargate SG-1 regular to appear on Atlantis, as the other three characters in the original SG-1 team all appeared in Atlantis's first season, as did other SG-1 characters Hank Landry and George Hammond. Of the three other SG-1 regulars (namely Cam Mitchell, Vala Mal Doran and Jonas Quinn), Mitchell and Vala visited Atlantis in the SG-1 crossover episode "The Pegasus Project". Jodelle Ferland, who plays Princess Harmony in the episode "Harmony", previously appeared in the episode "Flesh and Blood" in Stargate SG-1 season 10 as a young Adria; and Crystal Lowe previously appeared in the episode "Emancipation" in season 1 of Stargate SG-1, and Cassie Winslow and Christopher Orr and Connor Trinneer both reprising as Pitt Henderson and Michael Kenmore respectively.

Release and reception 
In September 2007, unfinished versions of "Adrift" and "Lifeline" were leaked onto the internet. Shortly after, fans who used iTunes to download "Adrift" discovered that they had in fact purchased "Doppelganger" instead, three weeks before it was set to premiere on Sci Fi Channel in the USA. The mix-up probably comes from the fact that "Doppelganger" was the first episode of the season to be filmed, and thus carries an internal production number of 401 at the studio. Late in the season, "Midway" was another episode that was mistakenly released by iTunes several days before its airdate. "Be All My Sins Remember'd" received a rating of 1.4 million viewers, the highest rated episode in the fourth season. It was also the US Sci-fi Channel's 2nd highest rated show that week: the 1st was an SF TV-movie, "Beyond Loch Ness" (which had a rating of 1.7 million), which happened to star Atlantis actor Paul McGillion and SG-1's Don S. Davis. Stargate Atlantis, Season 4, has been aired on the following channels: Sci-Fi Channel in the USA, TV6 in Sweden, and Sky 1 in the UK.

"Adrift" earned an Emmy nomination for "Outstanding Special Visual Effects For A Series", and "Best Visual Effects" for a Gemini Award. Jewel Staite has been nominated for a Gemini Award in the category of Best Performance by an Actress in a Continuing Leading Dramatic Role for her performance in "Missing". Alan McCullough has been nominated for a Gemini Award in the Best Writing in a Dramatic Series category for his episode "Tabula Rasa". "The Last Man" has been nominated for a Gemini in the Best Achievement in Make-Up category.

DVD releases

References

External links

 Season 4 on GateWorld
 Season 4 on IMDb
 Season 4 on TV.com
 

.4
2007 American television seasons
2008 American television seasons
Atlantis 04
2007 Canadian television seasons
2008 Canadian television seasons